Mohammad Delavari (Persian: محمد دلاوری)  is an Iranian writer, journalist and television presenter. He is best known for making several television shows and controversial interviews with Iranian politicians.

Honors 
In March 2019, Delavari, along with Ehsan Alikhani, Reza Rashidpour and Rambod Javan, were selected as the top presenters of Jaame Jam as one of the candidates for the best TV personality of the 20th Hafez Awards.

Dismissal from TV journalism 
He was fired from television for making television programs in which he criticized official Iranian politicians. But after a few years, he Re-created and performed television programs. Some of these TV programs, such as "Tehran 20", caused a lot of controversy by Iranian users in virtual networks and provoked various reactions.

Published books 
He is the author of several books including the series “Journalism without pain and bleeding”. Upon returning from his assignment in Europe, Delavari published the book 976 Days in the Streets of Europe, which went to print ten times.

References 

Iranian journalists
Iranian radio and television presenters
Iranian television news anchors
1973 births
Living people